Niederman or Niedermann is a surname. Notable people with the surname include:

 Derrick Niederman, American author, mathematician, and game designer
 James Corson Niederman (born 1924), American epidemiologist
 J. C. U. Niedermann (1810–?), American politician
 Marie Niedermann (1880–1967), Danish film actress
 Paul Niedermann (1927–2018), German-Jewish journalist